Picco is a 2010 German crime film directed by Philip Koch.

Cast 
 Constantin von Jascheroff as Kevin
 Joel Basman as Tommy
 Frederick Lau as Marc
  as Andy

References

External links 

2010 crime films
2010 films
German crime films
2010s German films